Vasleh (also Romanized as Vaşleh, Vaslah, and Wasleh) is a village in Kuhin Rural District, in the Central District of Kabudarahang County, Hamadan Province, Iran. At the 2006 census, its population was 340, made up of 59 families.

References 

Populated places in Kabudarahang County